Travira Air (IATA: TR) is an airline based in Jakarta, Indonesia. It operates charter flights between Indonesian cities and other Asian countries. It is a small/midsize operator.

Travira's aircraft are used for long-term deals with major mineral companies, such as ExxonMobil, West Natuna Consortium, and mining companies in Sumbawa and East Kalimantan.  Travira Air is listed in category 1 by Indonesian Civil Aviation Authority for airline safety quality.

Travira Air use the ATR 72 to operate charter flight between Halim-Matak route for mineral companies.

Fleet
The Travira Air fleet includes the following aircraft (as of October 2019):

The Travira Air fleet previously included the following aircraft (as of January 2015):

 3 Raytheon Beech 1900D Airliner
 1 ATR 42-500
 3 Cessna 208 Caravan
 4 Bell 412 EP
 1 Boeing 737-500 (sold and re-registered as T7-CTA) 
 1 Boeing 737-800 (sold to Fly Baghdad) 
 1 Sikorsky S-76A
 2 Sikorsky S-76A++
 2 Sikorsky S-76C++
 1 Sikorsky S-76C
 1 Sikorsky S-76C+
 1 Eurocopter AS350
 1 Hawker 800XP
 1 EC 145

References

External links

 Official website

Airlines of Indonesia
Airlines established in 1983
Charter airlines